Great Britain competed at the 1992 Summer Paralympics in Barcelona, Spain. It finished third in the overall medal count, with a total of 128 medals.

Medalists

Gold medalists

Silver medalists

Bronze medalists

Medals by sport

See also 
 Great Britain at the Paralympics
 Great Britain at the 1992 Summer Olympics

References

External links
British Paralympic Association Website

Nations at the 1992 Summer Paralympics